A Perfect Spy is a BBC serial adaptation of John le Carré's 1986 spy novel A Perfect Spy which was aired on BBC2 and broadcast from 4 November to 16 December 1987. It follows the career of the British MI6 spy Magnus Pym from his early days as a schoolboy to his eventual disappearance as a suspected agent of the Czech secret service. The series was nominated for the Primetime Emmy Award for Outstanding Miniseries and the British Academy Television Award for Best Drama Series in 1988.

Plot summary
A Perfect Spy traces the life story of Magnus Pym and his career in British intelligence and as a double agent. The series recounts Pym's childhood with his con-man father, his early years at school and university, his encounters with long-time friend and Czech spy Axel, and his final downfall.

Main cast
Peter Egan as Magnus Pym (episodes 3 to 7)
Benedict Taylor as Young Adult Magnus Pym (episodes 1 and 2)
Jonathan and Nicholas Haley as Child Magnus Pym (episode 1)
Ray McAnally as Rick Pym
Rüdiger Weigang as Axel
Alan Howard as Jack Brotherhood
Jane Booker as Mary Pym
Tim Healy as Syd Lemon 
Peggy Ashcroft as Miss Dubber
Sarah Badel as Baroness Weber
Ian McNeice as Sefton Boyd
Julian Firth as Young Sefton Boyd
Garrick Hagon as Grant Lederer
Lesley Nightingale as Sabina

Episodes

Reception
John J. O'Connor of The New York Times cited the series as "on a par with Tinker, Tailor, Soldier, Spy and Smiley's People,", and wrote it "makes another very impressive addition to the television record of Le Carre explorations. Gloomy and disturbing, to be sure, but singularly absorbing."

Awards and nominations 

The series was nominated for five  BAFTA Awards in 1988, for Drama Series (Colin Rogers, Peter Smith), Ray McAnally for Actor, Michael Storey for Original Music and Television Craft for Film Cameraman (Elmer Cossey) and Film Sound (Malcolm Webberley, Ken Hains, Tony Quinn, Graham Lawrence, John Hyde).

After airing in the United States on Masterpiece Theater, the series was nominated for two Emmy Awards at the 41st Primetime Emmy Awards, for Outstanding Miniseries and Peggy Ashcroft for Outstanding Supporting Actress in a Miniseries.

References

External links 
 

1987 British television series debuts
1987 British television series endings
1980s British drama television series
BBC television dramas
Espionage television series
1980s British television miniseries
John le Carré
Television shows based on British novels
English-language television shows
Secret Intelligence Service in fiction